Amauropelma is a genus of Australian and Asian wandering spiders first described by Robert Raven, Kylie S. Stumkat & Michael R. Gray in 2001.

Species
 it contains twenty-four species:
Amauropelma annegretae Jäger, 2012 – Laos
Amauropelma anzses Raven & Stumkat, 2001 – Australia (Queensland)
Amauropelma beyersdorfi Jäger, 2012 – India
Amauropelma bluewater Raven & Stumkat, 2001 – Australia (Queensland)
Amauropelma claudie Raven & Stumkat, 2001 – Australia (Queensland)
Amauropelma ekeftys Jäger, 2012 – India
Amauropelma fungifer (Thorell, 1890) – Malaysia
Amauropelma gayundah Raven & Stumkat, 2001 – Australia (Queensland)
Amauropelma gordon Raven & Stumkat, 2001 – Australia (Queensland)
Amauropelma hasenpuschi Raven & Stumkat, 2001 – Australia (Queensland)
Amauropelma hoffmanni Jäger, 2012 – Laos
Amauropelma jagelkii Jäger, 2012 – Laos
Amauropelma leo Raven & Stumkat, 2001 – Australia (Queensland)
Amauropelma matakecil Miller & Rahmadi, 2012 – Indonesia (Java)
Amauropelma mcilwraith Raven & Stumkat, 2001 – Australia (Queensland)
Amauropelma monteithi Raven & Stumkat, 2001 – Australia (Queensland)
Amauropelma mossman Raven & Stumkat, 2001 – Australia (Queensland)
Amauropelma pineck Raven & Stumkat, 2001 – Australia (Queensland)
Amauropelma rifleck Raven & Stumkat, 2001 – Australia (Queensland)
Amauropelma staschi Jäger, 2012 – India
Amauropelma torbjorni Raven & Gray, 2001 – Australia (Queensland)
Amauropelma trueloves Raven & Stumkat, 2001 (type) – Australia (Queensland)
Amauropelma undara Raven & Gray, 2001 – Australia (Queensland)
Amauropelma wallaman Raven & Stumkat, 2001 – Australia (Queensland)

References

Araneomorphae genera
Ctenidae
Spiders of Australia